True Confessions may refer to:

 True Confessions (album), 1986, by Bananarama
 True Confessions (magazine)
 True Confessions, a 1985 anthology television series inspired by the magazine, produced by Alan Landsburg
 True Confessions (novel), 1977, by John Gregory Dunne
 True Confessions (film), 1981, based on the novel
 Tru Confessions, a 2002 Disney Channel film
 "True Confessions", a 1979 song by The Undertones from their eponymous debut album
 "True Confessions", a 1997 song by the Iron Sheiks (Tragedy Khadafi and Imam T.H.U.G.)
 True Confessions, a 2002 romance novel by Rachel Gibson

See also